Hooke is a surname. Notable people with the surname include:

 Hilda Mary Hooke (1898–1978), Canadian writer
 John Hooke (1270–1275), Chancellor of the University of Cambridge
 Luke Joseph Hooke (1716–1796), Irish theologian
 Robert Hooke (1635–1703), English natural philosopher who discovered Hooke's law
 S. H. Hooke (1874–1968), English scholar of comparative religion